Margomulyo is a district in Bojonegoro Regency, East Java, Indonesia. It is located in the southwest of the regency and borders Ngraho District to the north, Tambakrejo District to the east, Ngawi Regency to the south, and Central Java Province to the west. The followers of Saminism Movement live in this district and are still practising their belief.

Administration
Margomulyo is divided into 6 administrative villages, listed below:

Transport

Roads
Indonesian National Route 20 runs from Babat to Caruban through Margomulyo.

References

Districts of East Java
Bojonegoro Regency